CoffeeFest (Literary Serbian: Кофифест, Kofifest) is a regional, annual coffee festival that is held every  last weekend in September on the Ušće street in Belgrade, Serbia across the Ušće Shopping Center. The Belgrade coffee, tea and hot beverage festival is supported by the Serbian Ministry of Trade, Tourism and Telecommunications, City of Belgrade Belgrade Tourism Organization, Serbian Tourism Organization, and the Serbian Chamber of Commerce. The festival organizer is a PCO company Oivivio LLC headquartered in Beverly Hills, California.

Exhibit area consists of over 2,000 m2 is set up on the closed-for-traffic street passing by the shopping mall. Among the exhibitors there was importers, distributors and roasters of domestic, traditional coffee, espresso, single origin coffees, espresso machines, capsules, pods, instant coffees, water, teas, milk for coffee, RTD coffee and more. The first CoffeeFest held on September 26–27, 2014 hosted 37 brands on 29 exhibition booths and had participants from Greece,  Hungary, Italy, Lebanon, the Netherlands, Poland, Serbia, Switzerland and United States and attracted 18,210 visitors from Serbia and neighboring countries.

Exhibitors at first CoffeeFest were manufacturers, distributors and companies whose business include:
 Coffee, tea, tea biscuits, chocolate, milk, creamers, water, syrup, sugar, cocoa and other supplements for coffee and tea
 Professional and home coffee-making machines and vending, water filters and cleaning agents
 Organizations, institutions and associations dealing with catering, food, nutrition and medicine, as well as research, training, consultancy and certification of hot drinks and accompanying products

Barista training
CoffeeFest organizers provided training
for almost 50 baristas. Advanced training attended 38 baristas. Trainers donated their time, energy and knowledge so the training was free of charge for all baristas. Barista Training was conducted by Mr.
Ivan Abramo and Molinari Coffee from Italy and Java Coffee Company from Poland.

Program
Besides sampling all the different coffee and tea tastes, visitors enjoyed entertainment program, musical performances and competitions. The best baristas showcased their craft and educated visitors how to make a perfect espresso and latte art, and taught them how to choose a coffee machine. The attendees found out how coffee grows, how people drink it around the world, how it
affects the health, and everything else they ever wanted to know about this beverage. For the youngest there were a lot of fun in the children's corner plus the program on recycling awareness.

Media coverage
Media coverage of CoffeeFest 2014 contains more than 150 media items in the print, radio, TV and electronic media. Media showed a lot of interest for the first regional coffee Festival and reported on the event in all its phases.

See also

References

External links
 Official website 
  Official After Movie

Food and drink festivals in Serbia
Coffee culture
Culture in Belgrade
Tourist attractions in Belgrade
Food and drink festivals
Autumn events in Serbia